A Bit of Bad Luck is a 2014 American thriller comedy film written and directed by John Fuhrman and starring Cary Elwes. It is set in Seattle, and was filmed in Seattle and Morton, Washington.

Cast
Cary Elwes as Brooks
Teri Polo as Amanda 
Agnes Bruckner as Heather
Marshall Bell as Mr. Creech

References

External links
 
 

American comedy thriller films
American comedy-drama films
Films set in Seattle
Films shot in Seattle
2010s English-language films
2010s American films